Peter George Kmetovic (December 27, 1919 – February 8, 1990) was an American football player.

A halfback, Kmetovic played college football for Stanford University, helping the team reach the 1941 Rose Bowl. In the game, Kmetovic rushed for 141 yards and returned a punt for a touchdown to lead the Indians to a 21-13 victory over Nebraska. For his efforts, Kmetovic was named the Rose Bowl Player of the Game.

He was drafted by the Philadelphia Eagles in the 1942 NFL Draft, but did not play.  He played for the Eagles in the 1946 season, and for the Detroit Lions for the 1947 season.

His great-grandson, Jack Tiernan O'Brien, plays college soccer for the Stanford Cardinal men's soccer team.

References

1919 births
1990 deaths
American football halfbacks
Detroit Lions players
Great Lakes Navy Bluejackets football players
Philadelphia Eagles players
Stanford Cardinal football players
Players of American football from San Jose, California